The Adorable Cheat is a 1928 silent film starring Lila Lee and distributed by an independent film company, Chesterfield Motion Pictures. It was directed by Burton L. King with a copy being long held by The Library of Congress.

Summary
The daughter of a wealthy industrialist wants to take over the company when her father retires, but the father—an old-fashioned sort who doesn't believe that "girls" belong in business—is planning on leaving the company to her wastrel playboy brother. In order to prove to her dad that she can handle the job, she disguises herself as an ordinary "working girl" and gets a job in her dad's plant. There she meets and falls in love with a clerk. She brings the young man home to meet her folks, but during the evening the family safe is robbed, and all signs point to her new boyfriend.

Cast
Lila Lee - Marion Dorsey
Cornelius Keefe - George Mason
Reginald Sheffield - Will Dorsey
Burr McIntosh - Cyrus Dorsey
Gladden James - Howard Carter
Harry Allen - 'Dad' Mason
Alice Knowland - Mrs. Mason
Virginia Lee - Roberta Arnold
Rolfe Sedan - Card Playing Guest

References

External links

1928 films
American silent feature films
Films directed by Burton L. King
American black-and-white films
Chesterfield Pictures films
1928 romantic drama films
1920s American films
Silent American drama films